John Kruesi (May 15, 1843 – February 22, 1899) was a Swiss-born machinist, and close associate of Thomas Edison.

Career
John Kruesi had been apprenticed as a locksmith in Switzerland, and migrated to the United States where he settled in Newark, New Jersey. There, he met Thomas Edison. Edison employed him for his workshop in 1872.

Kruesi became Edison's head machinist through his Newark and Menlo Park periods, responsible for translating Edison's numerous rough sketches into working devices. Since constructing and testing models was central to Edison's method of inventing, Kruesi's skill in doing this was critical to Edison's success as an inventor. Historians Robert Friedel and Paul Israel summed up Kruesi's remarkable ability of this:

If the devices that emerged [from Kruesi's workshop] didn't work, it was because they were bad ideas, not because they were badly made. And when the ideas were good, as in the case of the phonograph, the product of Kruesi's shop would prove it. (Friedel and Israel 1987, 35)

Kruesi was also involved in many of Edison's key inventions. Including the quadruplex telegraph, the carbon microphone, phonograph, incandescent light bulb and system of electric lighting.

With the development of Edison's system of electric lighting, Kruesi moved to more management positions. In 1881, Edison put Kruesi in charge of the Edison Electric Tube Company, making him responsible for the installation of underground power distribution cables from the central generating station. Kruesi was also an inventor, while at the Electric Tube Company, he devised a two wire conduit in which two semicircular conductors were separated by an insulator and covered in insulating material. Kruesi became assistant general manager of the lower Manhattan Edison Machine Works in 1894. The Edison Machine Works moved to Schenectady, NY in 1886 and was merged into Edison General Electric in 1889. When that company merged with several others to form General Electric Company in 1892, Kruesi was promoted to General Manager, and then to Chief Mechanical Engineer  at the Schenectady site in 1896.

Notes

References
 IEEE Global History Network, John Kruesi
 Hammond, John Winthrop. Men and Volts, the Story of General Electric, published 1934 by J.B.Lippincott Company. Citations: Assistant General Manager Edison Machine Works – 149; came to Schenectady – 149; Consulting engineer – 245, 276; Edison's machine-shop expert – 22; Manager Schenectady Works – 197, 242.
 Friedel, Robert, and Paul Israel. 1987. Edison's electric light: biography of an invention. New Brunswick, New Jersey: Rutgers University Press.

External links

1843 births
1899 deaths
American engineers
Machinists
People from Newark, New Jersey
Swiss engineers
Engineers from New Jersey
Swiss emigrants to the United States